The men's individual all-around competition was one of eight events for male competitors in artistic gymnastics at the 1976 Summer Olympics in Montreal. The qualification and final rounds took place on July 18, 20 and 21st at the Montreal Forum. There were 90 competitors from 20 nations. Each nation could send a team of 6 gymnasts or up to 3 individual gymnasts. The event was won by Nikolai Andrianov of the Soviet Union, the nation's fourth victory in the event (matching Italy for most among nations at that point). It was the Soviets' return to the podium in the event after a one-Games absence in 1972 snapped a five-Games medal streak. Japan, which had swept the medals in 1972, took silver and bronze this time. Two-time defending champion Sawao Kato finished second, becoming the first man to earn three medals in the men's all-around and the most decorated man in the event's history (later tied by Kōhei Uchimura with two golds and a silver from 2008 to 2016). Mitsuo Tsukahara earned bronze.

Background

This was the 17th appearance of the men's individual all-around. The first individual all-around competition had been held in 1900, after the 1896 competitions featured only individual apparatus events. A men's individual all-around has been held every Games since 1900.

Four of the top 10 gymnasts from the 1972 Games returned: two-time gold medalist Sawao Kato of Japan, silver medalist (and 1968 fourth-place finisher) Eizo Kenmotsu of Japan, fourth-place finisher Nikolai Andrianov of the Soviet Union, and eighth-place finisher Mitsuo Tsukahara of Japan. Reigning (1974) World Champion Shigeru Kasamatsu of Japan missed the 1976 Games with an emergency appendectomy; Andrianov had been the runner-up with Kenmotsu third.

Israel made its debut in the event. France and Italy both made their 15th appearance, tied for most among nations.

Competition format

The competition format followed the preliminary and final format introduced in 1972, but placed a limit on the number of finalists per nation. All entrants in the gymnastics competitions performed both a compulsory exercise and a voluntary exercise for each apparatus. The scores for all 12 exercises were summed to give an individual all-around preliminary score. Half of the scores from the preliminary carried over to the final, with the top 36 gymnasts advancing to the individual all-around final—except that each nation was limited to 3 finalists. There, each of the finalists performed another exercise on each apparatus. The sum of these scores plus half of the preliminary score resulted in a final total.

Each exercise was scored from 0 to 10; thus, the preliminary apparatus scores ranged from 0 to 20 each and the total preliminary score from 0 to 120. With half of the preliminary score and six more exercises scored 0 to 10, the final total was also from 0 to 120.

The preliminary exercise scores were also used for qualification for the apparatus finals.

Schedule

All times are Eastern Daylight Time (UTC-4)

Results

Ninety gymnasts competed in the compulsory and optional rounds on July 18 and 20. The thirty-six highest scoring gymnasts advanced to the final on July 21. Each country was limited to three competitors in the final. Half of the points earned by each gymnast during both the compulsory and optional rounds carried over to the final. This constitutes each gymnast's "prelim" score.

References

External links
Official Olympic Report
www.gymnasticsresults.com
www.gymn-forum.net

Men's individual all-around
Men's events at the 1976 Summer Olympics